The Shashti Vratam is a Hindu observance. It is primarily observed by South Indian Hindus during the month of Ashvina, from the first day after the full moon until the sixth day. Adherents fast for six days continuously in order to receive the blessings of the deity Murugan. Shashti Vratam is also prescribed for the worship of Surya in some texts.

Description

The Kanda Puranam states that one must bathe early on all six days of this occasion and worship Murugan as prescribed. A puja is performed, venerating the image of the deity, a kalasha, and Agni. Modakas are prescribed as an offering to the deity. On the seventh day that follows the period of fasting, special pujas are prescribed, and Brahmins are invited and fed. These practices are described to allow the performer to receive a high status in society.

According to Tamil mythology, Murugan is stated to have performed a yajna for six consecutive days during the Tamil month of Kartikkai to be blessed by his fatherShiva before going to war with the asura named Surapadman, making the practice auspicious.

References

Kaumaram
Hindu holy days

Hindu practices